Louis-Henri Brévière (15 December 1797, Forges-les-Eaux - 2 June 1869, Hyères) was a French engraver. He became known for reviving the art of carving in wood with a burin; which had fallen into neglect since the seventeenth century.

Biography 
From 1820 to 1830, he had a shop in Rouen. In 1823, he perfected a process for engraving the scrolls that were used for printing indiennes; a type of textile.

In 1834, he received a gold medal at the municipal exposition of fine arts and, in 1839, a large silver medal at the Salon in Paris. Shortly after. he was appointed Director of Engraving at the Imprimerie Nationale.

He purchased the Imprimerie Monton, in Les Andelys, in 1855. He retired to Rouen in 1863, where he wrote his memoirs, and died in Hyères, where he had gone to spend the winter.

A square in his hometown was nemd after him. In 1873, a small monument with a bust was erected there; designed by Jules Adeline and sculpted by Louis Auvray. The bust was melted down during World War II.

He created over 3,000 pieces, including illustrations for several titles in The Human Comedy by Balzac, Gulliver's Travels, by Jonathan Swift, and Robinson Crusoe by Daniel Defoe. In addition, he wrote De la xylographie, ou gravure sur bois (Of Xylography; or engraving on Wood, 1833).

References

Further reading 
 Alfred Baudry, Rapport sur les travaux de Henri Brévière, dessinateur et graveur, Rouen, Henry Boissel, 1869.
 Jules Adeline, L.-H. Brévière, dessinateur et graveur, rénovateur de la gravure sur bois en France, 1797-1869; notes sur la vie et les œuvres d'un artiste normand, Rouen, E. Augé, 1876

External links 

French engravers
19th-century engravers
1797 births
1869 deaths
People from Seine-Maritime